Leptopodomorpha is an infraorder of insects in the order Hemiptera (true bugs). Leptopodomorpha is an infraorder of the order Heteroptera that contains more than 380 species. These small insects are also called shore bugs, or spiny shore bugs. As their name suggests, shore bugs range from being intertidal, to living near streams and lakes. Four families belong to this infraorder, the largest of which is Saldidae with about 350 species, compared to about 30 in Leptopodidae, and only 5 and 1 in Omaniidae and Aepophilidae respectively. Saldidae are known in particular for their jumping ability.

Families
 Aepophilidae Puton, 1879
 monotypic Aepophilus bonnairei Signoret, 1879
 Leptopodidae- spiny shore bugs
 Omaniidae
 Corallocoris Cobben, 1970 – SE Asia, Australia, Oceania, Japan
 Omania: includes Omania coleoptrata Horváth, 1915 - Oman
 Saldidae- shore bugs

Leptopodomorpha amber fossils were found in the Dominican Republic and in Mexico, both dating back to the Miocene period. Fossils of Jurassic Archegocimicidae and Cretaceous Enicocorinae have also been found, and are presumed to be Leptopodomorpha.

References

External links
Tree of Life

 
Heteroptera
Protostome infraorders